Anton Pfeifer (born 21 March 1937) is a German politician of the Christian Democratic Union (CDU) and former member of the German Bundestag.

Life 
Pfeifer was a member of the German Bundestag from 1969 to 2002. He always entered the Bundestag as a directly elected member of the Reutlingen constituency.

Literature

References

1937 births
Members of the Bundestag for Baden-Württemberg
Members of the Bundestag 1998–2002
Members of the Bundestag 1994–1998
Members of the Bundestag 1990–1994
Members of the Bundestag 1987–1990
Members of the Bundestag 1983–1987
Members of the Bundestag 1980–1983
Members of the Bundestag 1976–1980
Members of the Bundestag 1972–1976
Members of the Bundestag 1969–1972
Members of the Bundestag for the Christian Democratic Union of Germany
Parliamentary State Secretaries of Germany
Living people
Commanders Crosses of the Order of Merit of the Federal Republic of Germany
Recipients of the Order of Merit of Baden-Württemberg